The 2018–19 CWHL season was the 12th and final season of the Canadian Women's Hockey League.

Offseason
July 16: The CWHL contracted the Vanke Rays' membership after one season to focus solely on the Kunlun Red Star team in China.
July 19: Jayna Hefford was appointed to the position of interim commissioner of the CWHL, replacing inaugural commissioner Brenda Andress, who tendered her resignation.
August 3: The Kunlun Red Star franchise was rebranded as the Shenzhen KRS Vanke Rays as part of integrating the CWHL's two teams in China. Rob Morgan, who served as the head coach of the Vanke Rays during the previous season, was also named as the general manager for the consolidated Chinese team.
August 20, 2018: The Boston Blades relocated to Worcester, Massachusetts and rebranded as the Worcester Blades. Home games are scheduled for the Fidelity Bank Worcester Ice Center.

One league movement
Starting in March 2018, and throughout the offseason, current and former players took to social media to promote the concept of one unified professional women's hockey league. Players had utilized the hashtag #OneLeague to indicated their support.

CWHL draft

Heading into the draft, the league reported that general managers were authorized to "pre-sign" their first and second round selections prior to the draft. The window for pre-signing expired on August 17.

Head coaching and front office personnel changes

Head coaches

Front office

Standings
Final standings

 Advanced to playoffs

Clarkson Cup playoffs

Awards and honors

Regular season

Postseason awards
2019 Clarkson Cup Playoff MVP: Brianna Decker
First Star of the Game: Zoe Hickel
Second Star of the Game: Ann-Sophie Bettez
Third Star of the Game: Kacey Bellamy

References

External links
 

 
Canadian Women's Hockey League seasons
1